Ceresiosaurus is an extinct aquatic genus of lariosaurine nothosaurid sauropterygian known from the Middle Triassic (Anisian-Ladinian boundary) of Monte San Giorgio, southern Switzerland and northern Italy. Ceresiosaurus, meaning "Lizard of Ceresio" (Ceresio is the name of the Lake Lugano, in Switzerland). The type species, Ceresiosaurus calcagnii, was named by Bernhard Peyer in 1931. C. calcagnii is known from both the Cava superiore and Cava inferiore beds of the Lower Meride Limestone at Monte San Giorgio, dating to the latest Anisian of the Middle Triassic. Rieppel (1998) suggested that the back then monospecific genus Ceresiosaurus, is a junior synonym of the better known Lariosaurus, yet he kept it type species as a separate species under the new combination L. calcagnii. In 2004, however, this synonymy was objected by Hänni who described and name a second species of Ceresiosaurus, C. lanzi - a separation supported by several other authors since. This species is known only from the stratigraphically younger Cassima beds of Monte San Giorgio, although also from the Lower Meride Limestone, dating to possibly the lowest Ladinian age. The species in a subtropical lagoonal environment with varying open marine influences, and alongside many related but smaller species of nothosaurids and pachypleurosaurids. Ceresiosaurus represents one of the largest vertebrate of up to  snout-tail length from the very diversified paleoenvironment of the Middle Triassic Monte San Giorgio.

Palaeobiology

 
Ceresiosaurus was much more elongated than its relatives, reaching  in length, and had fully developed flippers with no trace of visible toes. It had multiple elongated phalanges, making the flippers much longer than in most other nothosaurs, and more closely resembling those of the later plesiosaurs. Ceresiosaurus also had the shortest skull of any known nothosaur, which further increased its resemblance to plesiosaurs.

Although possessing a long neck and tail, Ceresiosaurus may not have  swum by undulating its body. Analysis of the bone structure of the hips and powerful tail suggest that it instead propelled itself through the water much like a penguin. The evidence of pachypleurosaurs in the preserved stomach of Ceresiosaurus remains lend credence to the theory of it being a fast swimmer.

References

External links 
 Palaeos.com

Nothosaurs
Triassic sauropterygians
Middle Triassic reptiles of Europe
Anisian life
Sauropterygian genera